Qamber (also spelled: Qambar)(Pashto and )is an administrative unit, known as Union council or Wards in Tehsil Babuzai, of Swat District in the Khyber Pakhtunkhwa province of Pakistan.

According to Khyber Pakhtunkhwa Local Government Act 2013. The District of Swat has 67 Wards, of which the amount of Village Councils is 170 in total, and there are also 44 Neighbourhood Councils.

Qamber is Territorial  Ward, which is further divided in three Village Councils:
 Qamber i (Village Council)
 Qamber ii (Village Council)
 Gulgram (Village Council)

See also 
 Babuzai
 Swat District

References

External links
Khyber-Pakhtunkhwa Government website section on Lower Dir
United Nations
Hajjinfo.org Uploads
 PBS paiman.jsi.com

Swat District
Populated places in Swat District
Union councils of Khyber Pakhtunkhwa
Union Councils of Swat District